Boğaziçi Hava Taşımacılığı (BHT, Bosphorus Air Transport), named after Boğaziçi (Turkish for Bosphorus), was a Turkish charter cargo/passenger airline that operated for two years starting in 1987.

History
BHT-Boğaziçi was 85% owned by Turkish Airlines and began services with a Douglas DC-10-10F and a Boeing 707-321C.  Freight charters were flown to America, Europe, Asia and Africa.  The aircraft were also used for passenger services serving Turkish migrant workers traveling home.  BHT also had a leased Boeing 727-264 but by 1989 the airline was in severe financial problems and shut down.

Fleet

2 Douglas DC-10-10
2 Boeing 707-321C
2 Boeing 727-264
 Fokker F-28

References

External links

Fleet and code information

Defunct airlines of Turkey
Airlines established in 1987
Airlines disestablished in 1989
Defunct charter airlines of Turkey